The Guarujá Open was a men's tennis tournament held in Guarujá, Brazil.

History
The tournament was originally part of the Grand Prix tennis circuit, it was played on hard until its last year in 1992. The tournament was suspended from the tour from 1984 to 1986. Brazilian tennis players enjoyed great success at the tournament, with all but two of the nine finals featuring a Brazilian and the home representatives winning four times (and Luiz Mattar three times consecutively).

Finals

Singles

Doubles

During 1991, two tournaments were played at Guarujá, both part of the ATP World Series. The second event, held in October, was played for the first and only time and referred to as the Bliss Cup. It was held on the hardcourts at Casa Grande Hotel, the same venue for the 1992 Guaruja event.

Challenger tournaments

Singles

References

ITF Search  (search Guaruja)

 
Grand Prix tennis circuit
Hard court tennis tournaments
Indoor tennis tournaments
Carpet court tennis tournaments
ATP Tour
ATP Challenger Tour
Tennis tournaments in Brazil